Enneapterygius rhabdotus, the umpire triplefin or South Pacific striped triplefin, is a species of triplefin blenny in the genus Enneapterygius. It was described by Ronald Fricke in 1994. This species occurs in the western central Pacific Ocean the Izu Peninsula in Japan, Taiwan, Batanes and Palawan in the northern Philippines, the Gulf of Thailand, Palau, and most of Melanesia east to the Pitcairn Islands.

References

rhabdotus
Fish described in 1994